Kalymnikos is a dance from the Greek island of Kalymnos in the Aegean Sea.

Greek dances
Kalymnos